The russet-bellied spinetail (Synallaxis zimmeri) is a species of bird in the family Furnariidae. It is endemic to Peru.

Its natural habitat is subtropical or tropical high-altitude shrubland. It is threatened by habitat loss.

References

External links
BirdLife Species Factsheet.

russet-bellied spinetail
Birds of the Peruvian Andes
Endemic birds of Peru
russet-bellied spinetail
Taxonomy articles created by Polbot